Steffi Graf was the defending champion but did not compete that year.

Mary Joe Fernández won in the final 6–4, 6–3 against Natasha Zvereva.

Seeds
A champion seed is indicated in bold text while text in italics indicates the round in which that seed was eliminated. The top four seeds received a bye to the second round.

  Arantxa Sánchez Vicario (semifinals)
  Conchita Martínez (quarterfinals)
  Lindsay Davenport (quarterfinals)
  Natasha Zvereva (final)
  Naoko Sawamatsu (semifinals)
  Amy Frazier (first round)
  Sabine Hack (first round)
  Mary Joe Fernández (champion)

Draw

Final

Section 1

Section 2

External links
 1995 State Farm Evert Cup Draw

Singles
1995 Newsweek Champions Cup and the State Farm Evert Cup